Lacertaspis lepesmei, also known as Angel's five-toed skink, is a species of lizard in the family Scincidae. It is endemic to the Bambouto massif, Cameroon. It is named after Pierre Lepesme, French entomologist.

References

Lacertaspis
Skinks of Africa
Reptiles of Cameroon
Endemic fauna of Cameroon
Fauna of the Cameroonian Highlands forests
Reptiles described in 1940
Taxa named by Fernand Angel